The Celastraceae (staff-vine or bittersweet) are a family of 97 genera and 1,350 species of herbs, vines, shrubs and small trees, belonging to the order Celastrales. The great majority of the genera are tropical, with only Celastrus (the staff vines), Euonymus (the spindles) and Maytenus widespread in temperate climates, and Parnassia (bog-stars) found in alpine and arctic climates.

Of the 97 currently recognized genera of the family Celastraceae, 19 are native to Madagascar and these include at least 57 currently recognized species. Six of these 19 genera (Brexiella, Evonymopsis, Hartogiopsis, Polycardia, Ptelidium, and Salvadoropsis) are endemic to Madagascar. Celastrus, Euonymus, Maytenus, Salacia, and Tripterygium are a few of the genera that belong to the Celastraceae family that are quite popular. These genera each have distinctive traits and functions of their own.

Genera
A complete list of the genera is:

 Acanthothamnus
 Allocassine
 Anthodon
 Apatophyllum
 Apodostigma
 Arnicratea
 Bequaertia
 Brassiantha
 Brexia
 Brexiella
 Campylostemon
 Canotia – crucifixion thorn
 Cassine
 Catha – khat
 Celastrus – staff vine or staff tree
 Cheiloclinium
 Crocoxylon
 Crossopetalum
 Cuervea
 Denhamia
 Dicarpellum
 Dinghoua
 Elachyptera
 Elaeodendron
 Empleuridium
 Euonymus – spindle
 Evonymopsis
 Fraunhofera
 Gloveria
 Glyptopetalum
 Goniodiscus
 Gyminda
 Gymnosporia
 Hartogiella
 Hartogiopsis
 Hedraianthera
 Helictonema
 Hexaspora
 Hippocratea
 Hylenaea
 Hypsophila
 Kokoona
 Lauridia
 Lepuropetalon
 Loeseneriella
 Lophopetalum
 Lydenburgia
 [[Macgregoria (plant)|Macgregoria]]
 Maurocenia
 Maytenus – maiten
 Menepetalum
 Microtropis
 Monimopetalum
 Mortonia
 Moya
 Mystroxylon
 Nicobariodendron
 Orthosphenia
 Parnassia
 Paxistima
 Peripterygia
 Peritassa
 Plagiopteron
 Platypterocarpus
 Plenckia
 Pleurostylia
 Polycardia
 Pottingeria
 Prionostemma
 Pristimera
 Psammomoya
 Pseudocatha
 Pseudosalacia
 Ptelidium
 Pterocelastrus
 Putterlickia
 Quetzalia
 Reissantia
 Robsonodendron
 Rzedowskia
 Salacia
 Salacighia
 Salaciopsis
 Salvadoropsis
 Sarawakodendron
 Scandivepres
 Schaefferia
 Semialarium
 Simicratea
 Simirestis
 Siphonodon
 Stackhousia
 Tetrasiphon
 Thyrosalacia
 Tontelea
 Torralbasia
 Tricerma
 Tripterococcus
 Tripterygium
 Tristemonanthus
 Wimmeria
 Xylonymus
 Zinowiewia

 Fossil genera
 †Celastrinites

References

University of Maryland: Cronquist Family Synonymy for Celastraceae

 
Rosid families
Taxa named by Robert Brown (botanist, born 1773)